"Difficult Love" is a song by Canadian artist City and Colour, from their sixth studio album A Pill for Loneliness. The song peaked at number 17 on the Canadian Rock Billboard chart.

Chart performance

References

External links

City and Colour songs
Songs written by Dallas Green (musician)
2020 songs